Che vita meravigliosa is the fourth studio album by the Italian singer-songwriter Diodato. It was released on 14 February 2020 by Carosello Records. The album peaked at number four on the Italian Albums Chart. The album includes the singles "Il commerciante", "Non ti amo più", "Che vita meravigliosa" and "Fai rumore".

Singles
"Il commerciante" was released as the lead single from the album on 16 April 2019. "Non ti amo più" was released as the second single from the album on 28 June 2019. "Che vita meravigliosa" was released as the third single from the album on 29 November 2019; it peaked at number 51 on the Italian Singles Chart. "Fai rumore" was released as the fourth single from the album on 7 February 2020. The song peaked at number one on the Italian Singles Chart. The song won Sanremo Music Festival 2020 and would have represented Italy in the Eurovision Song Contest 2020 in Rotterdam, the Netherlands before the show's cancellation due to the COVID-19 pandemic.

Track listing

Charts

Weekly charts

Year-end charts

Release history

See also
List of 2020 albums

References

2020 albums